What the Love! with Karan Johar is a 2020 reality streaming television series. The premise revolves around Karan Johar who tries to help six single people find love. It was released on January 30, 2020, on Netflix.

Episodes

Cast 
 Rameez Rizvi
 Samaksh Sudi
 Sahil Brown
 Karan Johar

External links

References 

2020s American reality television series
2020 American television series debuts
English-language Netflix original programming